Olivia Hye (also known as Go Won & Olivia Hye) is the twelfth single album from South Korean girl group Loona's pre-debut project. It was released digitally on the March 30, 2018, through Blockberry Creative and Vlending Co. LTD and was released physically on April 2, 2018, through Windmill Entertainment. The single formally introduces the twelfth and final member of Loona, Olivia Hye and thus marks the end of the pre-debut solo single concept. The single contains two tracks, Olivia's solo "Egoist" featuring JinSoul and a duet with Go Won titled "Rosy" which also features Heejin.

Track listing

Charts

References 

2018 singles
Loona (group) albums
Single albums
Blockberry Creative singles